The Bogda Shan range is part of the Eastern Tian Shan mountains and located in Xinjiang, some 60 km east of Ürümqi. The topography of the area gradually increases from north to south. The elevation is between 1380 and 5445 m, with the largest relative relief up to 4065 m. The highest elevation is Bogda Peak, at 5,445 m.

Administratively, the range forms the border between Dabancheng District to the south and Fukang City and Jimsar County to the north. In all three units, irrigated agriculture is based on the water flowing in streams that starts in the Bogda Shan.

References

Biosphere reserves of China
Mountain ranges of Xinjiang
Mountain ranges of the Tian Shan